The Khmer National Solidarity Party (KNSP) was a Cambodian political party founded in May 1997 by senior Khmer Rouge leader Khieu Samphan after his denunciation of Pol Pot and as he began distancing himself from the Khmer Rouge. Khieu Samphan was formerly the leader of the Cambodian National Unity Party. Khieu Samphan had announced the new party with the intention of backing the National United Front proposed by Prince Norodom Ranariddh for the 1998 election, but opposition from the ruling Cambodian People's Party led by Hun Sen prevented this from occurring. Khieu Samphan stated in 1998 of the elections that, "If the elections do not go ahead under the iron rule of Vietnamese communists and their puppet, we should be very happy and want to take part because we are democratic, pluralistic and free government."

See also
 Democratic National Union Movement

References

1997 establishments in Cambodia
1998 disestablishments in Cambodia
Defunct political parties in Cambodia
Khmer Rouge
Political parties established in 1997
Political parties disestablished in 1998
Socialist parties in Cambodia